The Madrean narrow-headed garter snake (Thamnophis unilabialis) is a species of snake in the family Colubridae. The species is endemic to Mexico.

References

Thamnophis
Reptiles described in 1985
Taxa named by Wilmer W. Tanner
Reptiles of Mexico